Fiona Mollison (born 9 January 1954) is a British television and theatre actress.

Her father managed a rubber company in British Malaya, and sent Fiona to England to a boarding school.  She attended Bush Davies School of Theatre Arts to learn ballet, but then switched to Central School of Speech and Drama to study acting instead.

Early in her career she appeared in 22 episodes of Strangers as WDC Vanessa Bennett.

In the 1987 television mini-series A Perfect Spy, based upon the novel by John Le Carré, Mollison portrayed the incisive wife of a recruitment officer within British intelligence.

Mollison appeared in the role of "Annie" in the 1992 BBC adaptation of Joseph Conrad's novel, The Secret Agent (with David Suchet, Cheryl Campbell and Janet Suzman).

Mollison also has appeared on episodes of Lytton's Diary (as Catherine Lytton), On the Up (as Jane Webster), As Time Goes By (as Sally Curtis), Hollyoaks, Hazell, Boon, Minder, The Bill,
Inspector Morse (as Sheila Phillipson in "Last Seen Wearing"), Trial & Retribution (in "Siren"), and Midsomer Murders (in "They Seek Him Here").

In 2000–2001, she played Victoria Hutchinson on the soap opera Hollyoaks.

Family
Mollison is married to the director David Gilmore.  She met Gilmore when she got a part in a play he was directing, Move Over Mrs Markham, where she played the au-pair. They have three sons, Charles, George and Edward, and live in Wimbledon, London, England. They also have a house in France, and she enjoys yoga and interior design in her spare time.

Filmography

References

1954 births
British stage actresses
British television actresses
British soap opera actresses
Living people
People from Java